The UC Riverside Highlanders men's basketball team represents the University of California, Riverside in Riverside, California, United States. The school's team currently competes in the Big West Conference and is led by coach Mike Magpayo. The Highlanders play their home games at the Student Recreation Center Arena. The program had its greatest success as a Division II program, making it to three Final Fours and the national title game in 1995.

In 2020, the future of the program was placed into doubt, as UC Riverside's leadership reportedly began considering cutting the university's entire athletics department in response to financial strain caused by the COVID-19 pandemic. However, in May 2021, the university announced that they had decided against eliminating athletics and will continue competing at the NCAA Division I level in all sports, thus saving the men's basketball program from extinction.

Postseason

NCAA Division II Tournament and College Division Tournament results
The Highlanders have appeared in the NCAA Division II Tournament 17 times (known as the College Division until 1973 but considered the same tournament). Their combined record is 29–18.

Season-by-season results

References

External links